Vanessa Jennifer Baden-Kelly (born September 8, 1985) is an American actress, writer, director, and producer. She is best known as a child actress in the Nickelodeon television series Gullah Gullah Island (1994–1998) and Kenan & Kel (1996–2000).

In 2017, she starred, co-wrote and co-produced the web series Giants, executive produced by Issa Rae. In 2019, she won a Daytime Emmy Award for her performance in Giants.

Early life 
Baden was born in Manhattan Beach, California, and raised in Satellite Beach, Florida, where she got her start as a model in print ads.

In 2004, she won the Florida District Miss Black and Gold Pageant, representing the Iota Delta chapter of Alpha Phi Alpha fraternity at a regional competition in Atlanta, Georgia. She graduated from Florida State University in Tallahassee, Florida in December 2007 with a degree in sociology.

Career 
Baden began her career as a child actress on television; her first major role was as Vanessa in the Nick Jr. television series Gullah Gullah Island. Following this, she portrayed Kyra Rockmore for more than 60 episodes of the teen sitcom Kenan & Kel, which also aired on Nickelodeon.

In 1997, she played a supporting role in the film Rosewood and served as a panelist on the children's game show Figure It Out. This was followed by a year-long hiatus from acting.

In 2011, Baden returned to the screen as Hope in the YouTube comedy series Fail, opposite King Bach. In 2012, she starred as Erin Mult in the television film Chris & Todd. In 2014, she played opposite Jenifer Lewis in the comedy feature film Secrets of the Magic City, directed by R. Malcolm Jones.

Since 2017, she has starred, co-written, and co-produced the web series Giants, which streams on Issa Rae's YouTube channel. She plays Journee in the series. Her performance in Giants garnered her a Daytime Emmy Award nomination for Outstanding Lead Actress in 2018, and a win in 2019.

Baden also works as a writer and producer; she co-wrote and co-produced several episodes of Giants, and has also written for The Huffington Post.

In May 2021, Baden's essay collection, Far Away from Close to Home: A Black Millennial Woman in Progress  will be published by Three Rooms Press.

Filmography

References

External links

 

1985 births
Living people
Actresses from Florida
Florida State University alumni
Satellite High School alumni
African-American female comedians
American women comedians
Actors from Manhattan Beach, California
Actresses from California
African-American actresses
American television actresses
American film actresses
American child actresses
African-American child actresses
African-American women writers
American women film directors
Film producers from California
Comedians from California
Film directors from California
American women film producers
21st-century American comedians
21st-century American actresses
21st-century African-American women
21st-century African-American people
20th-century African-American people
20th-century African-American women